Southern State Correctional Facility can refer to:
Southern State Correctional Facility (New Jersey)
Southern State Correctional Facility (Vermont)